Žitný ostrov, also called Veľký Žitný ostrov to differentiate it from Malý Žitný ostrov, is a river island in southwestern Slovakia, extending from Bratislava to Komárno. It lies between the Danube, its tributary Little Danube and Váh. The island is a major part of the Danubian Flat.

The main towns on the island are Komárno, Dunajská Streda and Šamorín. Boroughs of Bratislava, Vrakuňa and Podunajské Biskupice are also located on the island. The Slovnaft refinery is also located on the island. The island is the biggest drinking water reservoir in Slovakia, and one of the biggest in Europe as well. Because of its warm climate, good soils and water reservoirs it is an important agricultural region, with the best conditions for crop production. It is the most fertile region in Slovakia, causing the majority of the island to be deforested.

Southern parts of Žitný ostrov by the Danube are protected by Dunajské luhy Protected Landscape Area.

Etymology
The current Slovak name of the island is modern and it's derived from the phonetic similarity of German Schütt (meaning dike) and Slovak žito (rye). This name was accepted and is commonly used also because the island is a very fertile region used for crop production.

The original name of the island is of Hungarian origin (1250 Chollocuz). Stanislav incorrectly reconstructed the name as *Čalov (like Czech Čálovice, Serbian Čalovići or Polish Nieczałów, Varsik as *Čelov (like Čelovce in Eastern Slovakia). The Hungarian name Csallóköz is derived from the old Hungarian name of the Little Danube – Csalló.

Image gallery

See also 
Malý Žitný ostrov

References

External links 
Žitný ostrov at Slovakia.travel
 
 

River islands of Slovakia
Islands of the Danube
Hungarian-speaking countries and territories
Historical regions in the Kingdom of Hungary